The Paris–Ruhr was an express train that linked Paris in France, with Dortmund in Germany. The train was named after its two termini, Paris in the west and the Ruhr district in the east.  For most of its life, it was a Trans Europ Express (TEE).

F-Zug
The Paris–Ruhr was launched on 23 May 1954 as a single-class express train with train numbers FT 168 westbound and FT 185 eastbound. The schedule was designed to allow a traveller to attend a meeting in Paris in the afternoon and have dinner on his way back just after leaving Paris. This concept meant a departure from Dortmund as early as 5:30 in the morning and not arriving back in Dortmund until 00:45 (12:45 a.m.). Times from Cologne and the Belgian industrial cities in Wallonia were more convenient, with westbound departure between 7:00 and 10:15, returning from Paris between 7:30 p.m and 11:00 p.m. The service was operated by Deutsche Bundesbahn, originally using  diesel multiple units.

Trans Europ Express
On 2 June 1957, the Paris–Ruhr was one of the initial Trans Europ Express (TEE) services.  The rolling stock was given TEE signage on front but the use of VT 08 continued because the German TEE trainsets planned for it were not available in time. The timetable remained nearly unchanged as well. On 23 December 1957, the VT 08 were replaced by first-class DB Class VT 11.5 trainsets that were purpose-built for the TEE network. On 29 May 1960, the "mirror" of the Paris–Ruhr, the Parsifal was extended to Hamburg. In order to level-out the kilometer fees the French rolling stock used in the Parsifal was reallocated to the Paris–Ruhr and vice versa, so the extra kilometers in Germany were ridden by German trains without the need to pay kilometer fees for foreign tracks. As a result, the Paris–Ruhr was operated by French RGP-825 DMUs from 29 May 1960 until 30 May 1965.

Electrification in Germany proceeded and at the beginning of 1965 electric locomotives and TEE coaches were delivered. The rolling stock of the TEE Helvetia was replaced by electric-locomotive-hauled trains and its VT 11.5s were reallocated to the Paris–Ruhr. After completion of electrification in Belgium, the Paris-Ruhr was changed to an electric-locomotive-hauled train as well, on 1 June 1969.  On 3 June 1973, the service was renamed the TEE Molière.

References

Works cited

International named passenger trains
Named passenger trains of Germany
Named passenger trains of Belgium
Named passenger trains of France
Trans Europ Express
Railway services introduced in 1954
Railway services discontinued in 1973